Sea Sunday is the day which many Christian Churches set aside to remember and pray for seafarers and their families and give thanks for their lives and work. It is officially held on the second Sunday in July. During Sea Sunday, charities such as the Apostleship of the Sea, The Mission to Seafarers and the Sailors' Society as well as non-denominational groups such as Sea Cadets conduct fundraisers, hold parades, and run awareness campaigns about life at sea.

Religious organisations
Sea Sunday is supported by The Mission to Seafarers and the Sailors' Society. Many churches around the world hold celebrations, services and collections to support the work of seafarers around the world.

In the Catholic Church, Sea Sunday is supported by the Apostleship of the Sea. A second collection is held during Catholic Sea Sunday Mass, with all funds raised going to the Apostleship of the Sea to support its work. It is a day of remembrance, prayer and celebration, and an opportunity to think about and thank those seafarers who work tirelessly throughout the year bringing us goods we often take for granted.

Religious resources
All three agencies create church and fundraising resources for their annual Sea Sunday campaigns to help their respective churches to understand and celebrate Sea Sunday.

External links
 Sea Sunday video 
 Frequently Asked Questions about Sea Sunday. Apostleship of the Sea.
 Sea Sunday. The Mission to Seafarers.
 Sea Sunday. The Sailors' Society.
 Vatican Sea Sunday Message from the Pontifical Council for the Pastoral Care of Migrants and Itinerant People.
 Sea Sunday podcast. Apostleship of the Sea.

Maritime transport
July observances
Christian Sunday observances
Holidays and observances by scheduling (nth weekday of the month)